Red Alert is the fourth album by British jazz pianist Janette Mason. It is the first of her albums to be released on vinyl as well as in digital format and as a CD. Dot Time Records issued the CD (and accompanying digital release) in 2017 and the vinyl recording in March 2018.

Reception
Reviewing the album for The Guardian, John Fordham said: "With album Red Alert, London pianist Janette Mason’s trio – fuelled by energies from the Bad Plus, David Bowie, Goldfrapp, Robert Wyatt and plenty more – uncork a typically eclectic, skilful and audience-friendly brew."

Track listing
All tracks written by Janette Mason, except where noted.
 "Pent Up" – 5:51
 "Skating on Thin Ice" – 6:34
 "Evil of All Roots" – 5:02
 "Bridge 2 – London" (traditional; arranged by Janette Mason) – 0:30
 "SiSi" – 5:17
 "Red Alert" – 6:22
 "Bridge 1 – Westminster" (traditional; arranged by Janette Mason) – 0:49
 "The Yearning" – 8:25
 "Altered Reality" – 3:41
 "I See Seven" – 5:33

Personnel
Janette Mason – piano and synthesiser
Jack Pollitt – drums
Tom Mason – acoustic and electric bass

References

2017 albums
Janette Mason albums
Funk albums by British artists
Jazz albums by British artists